Big Brother 2003, also known as Big Brother 4, was the fourth series of the British reality television series Big Brother. The show followed thirteen contestants, known as housemates, who were isolated from the outside world for an extended period of time in a custom built House. Each week, one or more of the housemates were evicted by a public vote. The last remaining housemate, Cameron Stout, was declared the winner, winning a cash prize of £70,000.

As with the previous three series, Big Brother 4 lasted 64 days. It launched on Channel 4 on 23 May 2003 and ended on 25 July 2003. Davina McCall returned as presenter for her fourth consecutive year. Twelve housemates entered on launch night, with one additional housemate being introduced in the sixth week. The series was watched by an average of 4.6 million viewers, the fourth highest viewed series of the show to date (joint with Big Brother 6).

Big Brother 4 has since been regarded as one of the most "boring" series of the British edition of the show. It did, however, become memorable for a bomb scare that led to the temporary evacuation of the House, and for being the first UK series of Big Brother to feature a double eviction, foreign housemate exchange and a return of a previously evicted housemate.

Pre-Series

Auditions
Potential housemates applied by sending producers a home video that stated why they should be housemates. Successful candidates were invited to further rounds of auditions. This was the last year to feature this audition format as from Big Brother 5, open auditions were used to select housemates.

Big Brother 4 had more than 10,000 applicants apply to be a housemate.

Presenters
Davina McCall continued to host the main show and Dermot O'Leary continued to host the spin-off show, Big Brother's Little Brother. Marcus Bentley continued to narrate the show.

Promotion
This series was promoted as being a 'Back to Basics' edition; following the twists to the format introduced within the past series.

Promotion controversy
To promote the series, a large 210 ft hill figure of the eye logo was painted on the top of White Horse Hill, Oxfordshire, right above the famous Uffington White Horse, believed to be around 3,000 years old. The eye first appeared on 1 May 2003 and was created by seven circlemakers. Although permission for the figure's construction was agreed to by The National Trust, the figure angered local residents. It was washed off the day after completion.

This figure was one of several examples of the eye being presented as a geoglyph to promote the fourth series. Others included another hill figure, approximately half the size of that at Uffington, being placed next to Urquhart Castle, Loch Ness, Scotland, which appeared from 3–5 May, alongside a crop circle in a secret location in Southern England and as a depiction on a beach in Kidwelly, Wales.

Broadcasts
The series premiered on 23 May 2003, on Channel 4. The contestants were recorded 24 hours a day with cameras fixed around the house, and the wearing of portable microphones mandatory. Big Brother 4 was the second regular series to feature a live launch. The series ended on 25 July 2003, lasting for a total of 64 days. Channel 4 broadcast a 30-minute highlights show nightly, with each Friday episode being a live episode that saw one of the housemates evicted from the house. Live coverage from the house also remained a huge part of E4's daily and nightly schedule. A new show named Nominations Uncut was broadcast on E4 every Tuesday, in which it would show housemates nominations in full, rather than edited clips as seen in the main show. During Cameron's visit to Africa, E4 showed highlights of his stay straight after the main Channel 4 show.

Eye logo
The shape of the eye remained the same as the previous year, but a different art design was used. The eye was multi-coloured with black and white stripes beaming from the pupil of the eye.

Sponsorship
The series was the last to be sponsored by O2. The mobile network had sponsored Big Brother since Big Brother 2 in 2001.

House
The Big Brother house has been located at Elstree Studios, Borehamwood, Hertfordshire since the third series of the show. The house featured a completely new look compared to the previous series. The living room for this series was one-third smaller than the one featured in the previous series, and features red and green couches and chairs. The kitchen remained simple in design, with only necessities such as an oven, fridge, and sink included. The dining table was located beside the kitchen and was coloured yellow and white. The Diary Room featured a soft pink coloured background and contained a large blue chair. Like previous editions of the series, there were two bedrooms in this series, with the two being located beside one another for the first time. Big Brother 4 saw the return of the chicken coop in the garden, a feature used in the first two series. The chickens were used as a source of food (eggs), thus the housemates were not required to buy eggs as a part of their weekly shopping list. The house garden also included a large seating area and a vegetable patch which the housemates could use to grow plants and vegetables to eat. This series introduced the Rewards Room, where the winning housemates of the weekly live task were invited and were often thrown a party.

Format Changes
Big Brother 4 featured an opening night twist, like the previous two series. Housemates had to nominate one housemate for eviction on the first night, and any housemates who received even one nomination were automatically up against the public vote.

Later in the series, housemate, Cameron Stout, accepted a challenge from Big Brother and discovered it meant spending a week in the Big Brother Africa house. Housemate Gaetano spent time in the Big Brother 4 house while Cameron was in Africa.

Big Brother 4 was the first series to feature a double eviction, with two out of the three nominated housemates being evicted on Day 29. On Day 37, Lisa entered the house as part of a twist. This series was also the first to allow previously evicted housemates to return, with ex-housemate Jon entering the house for a second time on Day 50. He remained in the house until the finale, but was ineligible to win the grand prize.

Housemates

Post-Series

Housemates from Big Brother 4 failed to make many appearances in future regular series' since their evictions. However, Anouska was a participant in the 2004 spin-off series Big Brother Panto, along with other housemates from the first five series'. Housemate Federico later appeared in Big Brother 10, participating in a task celebrating ten years of the series, and Ultimate Big Brother saw housemate Lisa make an appearance participating in a task inspired by her time in Big Brother 4, and Jon also made a short appearance in a task.

Weekly summary

Nominations table

Notes

: On Launch Night, shortly after entering the house, all housemates had to nominate one fellow housemate based on first impressions. Any housemate who received a nomination automatically faced eviction.
: Week 4 was a double eviction. The three or more housemates with the most nominations faced the public vote, and the two people with the most votes to evict left the house on Day 29. 
: Cameron made his nominations from the Big Brother House in South Africa over the phone to Gaetano. Even though he could nominate, none of his fellow housemates could nominate him.
: As a new housemate, Lisa could not nominate and could not be nominated by her fellow housemates. As Cameron had only recently returned to the house from South Africa, he also could not be nominated by his fellow housemates, however he could still nominate. Due to a bomb scare on Day 43, the scheduled eviction for Week 6 was postponed to Day 44. That week's evictee, Gos, left the house to no crowd outside the house.
: Ray, as leader of the house in Week 7, was the only one who could nominate, and had to nominate three people. Following Lisa's eviction on Day 50, voting lines opened for the public to vote for an evicted housemate (either Justine, Sissy, Federico, Jon, Gos, or Lisa) to return to the house. As a guest in the Big Brother Australia house, Anouska was ineligible to go back, neither was Tania, who refused to return. As the chosen ex-housemate, Jon was granted re-entry into the house, but was ineligible to win.
:  Because Jon was a guest in the house, and was not eligible to win, he could not nominate and could not be nominated by his fellow housemates.
: There were no nominations in the final week. The public voted for who they wanted to win, rather than evict.

Bomb scare
On Day 43, a sniffer dog found a suspect package near to the house and directly near the stage where Davina McCall interviewed evicted housemates. The package was believed to contain a bomb and was found during a routine security check.

Just before 20:00, housemate Scott was informed in the Diary Room by Big Brother that all housemates were to go to the boys bedroom and remain there until further notice. Around 20:45, Hertfordshire Constabulary police force advised that all housemates were to be evacuated. Production staff and a camera crew entered the house, made them aware of the security alert and evacuated them. They were taken to a secure area on the perimeter of the studio complex, with high levels of security accompanying them.

At 21:35, Marcus Bentley informed the viewers that the Big Brother gallery, where the production crew monitored the house, also had to be evacuated, all filming was required to stop and as a result, cameras were turned off and all filming of the housemates in the secure area wasn't permitted, however they were still required to follow the rules of the show.

A 100-metre cordon was put into force around the house by police where the press and audience were required to wait for their safety. Bomb disposal police carried out a controlled explosion of the suspect package around 22:00 and turned out to be a false alarm. The all clear was given by police around 00:00. Just before 01:00 on Day 44, housemates were permitted by police to re-enter the house.

Two live shows at 20:30 and 22:00, where a housemate was due to be evicted, were cancelled by Channel 4 at short notice and instead, an episode of Friends was broadcast in its place. The eviction went ahead on Day 44 without a studio audience.

Reception
Big Brother 4 averaged a total of 4.6 million viewers throughout the course of the series, a decrease from the 5.8 million series average from Big Brother 3, however Big Brother 4 did have a slightly higher series average than the first two series of Big Brother UK.

The series is often regarded the 'most boring' series to be broadcast in the United Kingdom.
Weekly ratings for each show on Channel 4. All numbers are in millions and provided by BARB.

References

External links
Big Brother - Series 4 at Channel4.com

2003 British television seasons
4
Television shows shot at Elstree Film Studios